Miss World Bermuda is the national franchise of the Miss World pageant in the British Overseas Territory of Bermuda. Although Bermuda is under the jurisdiction of the United Kingdom, it still has its own contestant, very similar to many of the other BOTs.

Titleholders
Color key

References

External links
Official Miss World Website

Bermuda
Bermudian awards
Beauty pageants in Bermuda
1971 establishments in Bermuda

pt:Miss Mundo 2013